To Die in Paris is a 1968 TV film directed by Charles S. Dubin and Allen Reisner and starring Louis Jourdan, Kurt Kreuger, Phillippe Fourquet, and Stuart Nesbet.

Premise
During World War Two, a French resistance leader is accused of betraying his own side.

References

External links

To Die in Paris at New York Times
To Die in Paris at BFI

1968 television films
1968 films
1960s English-language films
Films directed by Charles S. Dubin